Comodica is a small genus of the fungus moth family, Tineidae. Therein, it belongs to the subfamily Erechthiinae. It is apparently a close relative of the type genus of its subfamily, Erechthias.

It is usually delimited sensu stricto, making it a smallish genus, with 11 species presently placed here:
 Comodica cirrhopolia (Turner, 1923)
 Comodica coarctata (J.F.G.Clarke, 1971)
 Comodica crypsicroca Turner, 1923 
 Comodica drepanosema Turner, 1923  
 Comodica lucinda Meyrick, 1927 
 Comodica ordinata Walsingham, 1914 
 Comodica polygrapta Meyrick, 1924 
 Comodica semiades Bradley, 1956 
 Comodica signata J.F.G.Clarke, 1986
 Comodica tetracercella Meyrick, 1880
 Comodica tigrina Turner, 1917

Erechthias and Comodica are not unequivocally delimited against each other yet. Some species of the former are occasionally placed in the present genus, namely:
 Erechthias citrinopa
 Erechthias contributa
 Erechthias decaspila
 Erechthias dochmogramma
 Erechthias epispora
 Erechthias eurynipha
 Erechthias saitoi

Mecomodica fullawayi is also sometimes placed in Comodica; it might alternatively belong in Erechthias or represent a distinct lineage not much closer to either of the two than to the other.

Footnotes

References

  (2010): Australian Faunal Directory – Erechthias. Version of 2010-NOV-15. Retrieved 2011-DEC-23.
  [2011]: Global Taxonomic Database of Tineidae (Lepidoptera). Retrieved 2011-DEC-22.

Tineidae
Tineidae genera
Taxa named by Edward Meyrick